Blagorrhina is a genus of long-beaked fungus gnats in the family Lygistorrhinidae.

Species
B. blagoderovi Hippa, Mattsson & Vilkamaa, 2005
B. brevicornis Hippa, Mattsson & Vilkamaa, 2005

References

Sciaroidea genera